The 2012 Asian Junior Men's Volleyball Championship was held in Urmia, Iran.

Pools composition
The teams are seeded based on their final ranking at the 2010 Asian Junior Men's Volleyball Championship.

* Withdrew

Preliminary round

Pool A

|}

|}

Pool B

|}

|}

Pool C

|}

|}

Pool D

|}

|}

Classification round
 The results and the points of the matches between the same teams that were already played during the preliminary round shall be taken into account for the classification round.

Pool E

|}

|}

Pool F

|}

|}

Pool G

|}

|}

Pool H

|}

|}

Classification 9th–12th

Semifinals

|}

11th place

|}

9th place

|}

Final round

Quarterfinals

|}

5th–8th semifinals

|}

Semifinals

|}

7th place

|}

5th place

|}

3rd place

|}

Final

|}

Final standing

Awards
MVP:  Masahiro Sekita
Best Scorer:  Javad Hosseinabadi
Best Spiker:  Jin Zhihong
Best Blocker:  Dipesh Kumar Sinha
Best Server:  Alireza Nasr Esfahani
Best Setter:  Mao Tianyi
Best Libero:  Raita Takino

References

External links
Asian Volleyball Confederation

Asian men's volleyball championships
Asian Cup
V
International volleyball competitions hosted by Iran
Asian Junior